The Indian Partnership Act, 1932 was enacted in India in 1932.

Provisions
Under section 44(d) of the Act, a suit can be filed against the managing partner for dissolution of the partnership firm.

THE INDIAN PARTNERSHIP ACT' 1932 Section.4 of the Indian Partnership Act, 1932 defines Partnership in the following terms:" Partnership is the relation between persons who have agreed to share the profits of a business carried on by all or any of them acting for all.""Section 464 of the Companies Act, 2013 empowers the Central Government to prescribe maximum number of partners in a firm but the number of partners so prescribed cannot be more than 50.The Central Government has prescribed maximum number of partners in a firm to be 50 vide Rule 10 of the Companies (Miscellaneous) Rules,2014.Thus, in effect, a partnership firm cannot have more than 50 members".

General duties of Partners

The Partners shall run the business of the firm to the highest level of common advantage by being true to each other. They have to be accountable to one another and provide complete information of all the aspects of the firm, to any other partner or their legal representatives.

Duty of indemnification

Each partner shall indemnify the firm for any loss that occurred due to fraud, in the conduct of the business.

References

Indian partnership act 1956

Acts of the Imperial Legislative Council
Partnerships
Legislation in British India
Indian business law
1932 in law
1932 in India